João Paulo da Costa Fernandes (born 1 December 1992) is an Angolan professional basketball player who plays for Sporting CP.

References

1992 births
Living people
Sporting CP basketball players
Centers (basketball)